Mitromica esperanza is a species of small sea snail, marine gastropod mollusk in the family Costellariidae, the ribbed miters.

Description

Distribution
This marine species occurs off Puerto Rico.

References

 Leal, J. H.; Moore, D. R. (1993). Thala esperanza, a new Costellariidae (Mollusca: Gastropoda) from northern Puerto Rico. Nautilus. 107(2): 58-62
 Turner H. 2001. Katalog der Familie Costellariidae Macdonald, 1860. Conchbooks. 1-100 page(s): 31

Costellariidae
Gastropods described in 1993